River City Soccer Hooligans, known in Japan as  is a sports game for the Nintendo DS. It was developed by Avit-Niigata, and published by Arc System Works (the eventual rights owner of the entire video games in Kunio-kun series) in Japan on May 27, 2010, and in North America, published by Aksys Games on June 10. This was the last Kunio-kun game for the Nintendo DS, as starting with Nekketsu Kōha Kunio-Kun Special handheld entries in the series were released for the Nintendo 3DS instead.

Summary
The game is based on Kunio Kun no Nekketsu Soccer League for the Famicom which was developed by Technōs Japan on April 23, 1993. However, Soccer League Plus is not a sequel to its two predecessors, but a continuation of Chō Nekketsu! Daiundōkai/River City Super Sports Challenge in which Michael Tobioka and his crews are back.

See also 
 List of Nintendo DS games
 Kunio-kun

References

External links
  River City Soccer Hooligans  official website for Japan 
River City Soccer Hooligans official website for North America

2010 video games
Arc System Works games
High school association football video games
Kunio-kun
Nintendo DS games
Nintendo DS-only games
Multiplayer and single-player video games
Video games developed in Japan